Straumen may refer to:

Places

Norway
Straumen, Finnmark, a village in Båtsfjord municipality, Finnmark county
Straumen, Ibestad, a village in Ibestad municipality, Troms county
Straumen, Kvæfjord, a village in Kvæfjord municipality, Troms county
Straumen, Lyngen, a village in Lyngen municipality, Troms county
Straumen, Nordland, a village in Sørfold municipality, Nordland county
Straumen, Sørreisa, a village in Sørreisa municipality, Troms county
Straumen Chapel, a parish church in Sørreisa municipality, Troms county
Straumen, Trøndelag, a village in Inderøy municipality, Trøndelag county

See also
Strømmen
Straume (disambiguation)